Spilarctia adelphus is a moth of the family Erebidae. It was described by Walter Rothschild in 1920. It is found on Sumatra in Indonesia.

References

adelphus
Moths described in 1920